Reinrassig is a German zoological term meaning "of pure breed".  In Nazi Germany, the term was applied to human races.  

By the racial policy of Nazi Germany, persons who could not trace Aryan ancestry back at least four generations could be considered nicht reinrassig or impure. Depending on one's ethnicity, this status could be anything from a very minor inconvenience to life-threatening.

See also

Mischling
Judenrein
Glossary of the Third Reich

References

Nazi eugenics
Nazi terminology
Holocaust terminology
German words and phrases